The 1948 Brooklyn Dodgers season was their third in the All-America Football Conference. The team failed to improve on their previous output of 3-10-1, winning only two games. They failed to qualify for the playoffs for the third consecutive season and the team folded after the season.

The team's statistical leaders included Bob Chappuis with 1,402 passing yards and Mickey Colmer with 704 rushing yards, 372 receiving yards and 60 points scored.

Season schedule

Division standings

References

Brooklyn Dodgers (AAFC) seasons
Brooklyn Dodgers
Brooklyn Dodgers (AAFC) season
1940s in Brooklyn
Flatbush, Brooklyn